The Daily Mercury is an online newspaper which serves the Mackay region in Queensland, Australia. Print edition was later revived with a publication on Friday only.

The newspaper is printed by Mackay Printing and Publishing and is owned by News Corp Australia.

History 
The Daily Mercury ran from 1866 to 1905 as the Mackay Mercury and South Kennedy Advertiser. From 1887 the paper was issued under the name Mackay Mercury until 1906 when the Daily Chronicle was absorbed by the paper and it was renamed the Daily Mercury.

Along with many other regional Australian newspapers owned by NewsCorp, the Daily Mercury ceased print editions in June 2020 and became online-only publication. The print edition was revived in late August, 2021 as a weekly, Friday-only edition.

Editors 

 ?? - May 2011: David Fisher
 May 2011 - ??: Jennifer Pomfrett
 ?? - ??: Jennifer Spilsbury
 ?? - ??: Jon Ortlieb
 November 2014 - ?? : Meredith Papavasiliou
 ?? - June 2018: Rowan Hunnam
 June–September 2018: Melanie Plane and Cas Garvey (acting)
 September 2018 - November: Paul McLoughlin
 November 2018 - January 2019: Melanie Plane (acting)
 January 2019 – Present: Rae Wilson

Digitisation 
The papers have been digitised as part of the Australian Newspapers Digitisation Program  of the National Library of Australia.

See also 
 List of newspapers in Australia

References

External links 
 
 
 

Mackay, Queensland
Newspapers published in Queensland
Publications established in 1867
APN Australian Regional Media
Daily newspapers published in Australia
Newspapers on Trove
Online newspapers with defunct print editions